Pjesma Mediterana (formerly Music Festival Budva) was a pop music festival held every summer in Budva, Montenegro until 2011. 

The festival began in 1992. There have been various sponsors of the festival, including: Komuna, Music Star Production and the Municipality of Budva. Since 2008, the municipality of Budva, HTP Budvanska Rivijera (a tourist company in Budva) and Copyright Ltd. have run the organisation. The executive producer from 2008 is Copyright Ltd. In 2011, the festival was cancelled reportedly due to financial crisis.

The Festival
Budva's summer music festival is the only open air music festival on the Balkans with a live band. The festival lasts three days. Day 1 and day 2 are the semi-finals and day 3 is the final day. It is usually held in June.

Hosts and winners

References

External links
Official Website
Former Website
Komuna Belgrade Official Website
 Copyright Budva Official Website
Tourist organisation of Budva Budva Official Website

Budva
Summer festivals
Music festivals in Montenegro
Recurring events established in 1992
Music competitions
Recurring events disestablished in 2010
Summer events in Montenegro